Richard Noel Skehan (born 6 December 1944)  is an Irish former hurler who played as a goalkeeper at senior level for the Kilkenny county team.

Born in Bennettsbridge, County Kilkenny, Skehan first arrived on the inter-county scene at the age of sixteen when he first linked up with the Kilkenny minor team before later joining the under-21 side. He joined the senior panel during the 1963 championship. Skehan spent almost a decade as a substitute before becoming a regular member of the starting fifteen and won nine All-Ireland medals (three of which were as a substitute), fourteen Leinster medals (six as a substitute) and three National Hurling League medals on the field of play. He was an All-Ireland runner-up on five occasions.

As a member of the Leinster inter-provincial team on a number of occasions Skehan won four Railway Cup medals. At club level he is a six-time championship medallist with Bennettsbridge.

His uncle, Dan Kennedy, and his first cousin, Ollie Walsh, also enjoyed All-Ireland success with Kilkenny.

Throughout his career Skehan made 42 championship appearances. He retired from inter-county hurling following the conclusion of the 1984-85 league.

In retirement from playing Skehan became involved in team management and coaching. After guiding the Kilkenny junior team to All-Ireland he also took charge of the intermediate side. As a selector under Brian Cody he guided the Kilkenny senior team to three All-Ireland titles.

Skehan is widely regarded as one of the greatest goalkeepers of all time. During his playing days he won seven All-Star awards as well as being named Texaco Hurler of the Year. He has often been voted onto teams made up of the sport's greats, including as goalkeeper on the Supreme All-Stars team. Skehan was also chosen as one of the 125 greatest hurlers of all-time in a 2009 poll.

Early life

Noel Skehan was born in Bennettsbridge, County Kilkenny on 6 December 1944.  He was born into a family, and into an area, that had a strong association with hurling.  His uncle, Dan Kennedy, captained Kilkenny to victory over Cork in the 1947 All-Ireland final, while his mother, May, was a first cousin of the legendary Kilkenny goalkeeper Ollie Walsh.  He lived on the famous Woodlawn Estate with many other famous hurlers including Paddy Moran, Séamus Cleere, Liam Cleere, John Kinsella, Pat Lawlor and Liam Simpson.  Together these players have over twenty All-Ireland medals.  Skehan was educated locally in Bennettsbridge and naturally showed a great skill at the game of hurling in his youth.

Playing career

Club

Skehan was just out of the minor grade when he joined the Bennettsbridge senior team. It was a glorious era for the club, with Skehan at right wing-forward when the Bridge faced Glenmore in the championship decider. On a day when five Treacy brothers lined out for Bennettsbridge, the team recorded a 4-9 to 1-4 victory. It was Moran's fourth championship medal. It was Skehan's first championship medal.

Mooncoin ended hopes of retaining the title in 1965, as Skehan suffered his first defeat in a county final. Both sides renewed their rivalry in the 1966 decider, with Skehan moving from the forwards to goalkeeper. A double scores 4-8 to 2-4 victory avenged the previous year's defeat and gave Skehan a second championship medal.

Bennettsbridge continued to dominate club hurling once again in 1967. A 3-10 to 1-4 defeat of Thomastown earned a third championship medal for Skehan.

A period of decline followed after a defeat by Rower-Inistioge in the 1968 decider, however, Bennettsbridge returned to the summit of club hurling once again in 1971. A 3-10 to 1-7 defeat of reigning champions Fenians gave Skehan his fourth and final championship medal.

Minor

Skehan was sixteen year-old when he was called up to the Kilkenny minor team in 1962. He won a Leinster medal that year following a narrow 5-7 to 5-4 defeat of Wexford in the provincial decider. On 2 September 1962 Kilkenny faced Tipperary in the All-Ireland final. Goals were key in the 3–6 to 0–9 victory with Skehan, who kept a clean sheet, winning an All-Ireland Minor Hurling Championship medal.

Senior

Substitute successes

In 1963 Skehan joined the Kilkenny senior hurling panel as understudy to his first cousin and legendary goalkeeper Ollie Walsh. He remained on the bench for provincial decider, however, Skehan did collect a Leinster medal as a non-playing substitute following a 2–10 to 0–9 defeat of Dublin. He remained on the bench for the subsequent All-Ireland decider against Waterford on 1 September 1963. Kilkenny won the game by 4-17 to 6-8, with Skehan collecting an All-Ireland medal as a member of the extended panel.

Skehan collected a second Leinster medal as a non-playing substitute in 1964 as Dublin were defeated on a 4–11 to 1–8 score line, however, the Cats faced a humiliating defeat by Tipperary in the subsequent All-Ireland decider.

After surrendering their provincial crown in 1965, Kilkenny bounced back the following year. Skehan added a third Leinster medal to his collection, once again as an unused substitute, following a 1–15 to 2–6 defeat of Wexford. Kilkenny were subsequently defeated by Cork in the All-Ireland decider.

Kilkenny retained their provincial crown following a 4–10 to 1–12 defeat of Wexford after a scare in the opening half. It was a fourth Leinster medal for Skehan as a non-playing substitute. He was confined to the bench once again for Kilkenny's 3-8 to 2-7 defeat of Tipperary in the All-Ireland decider on 3 September 1967. It was Skehan's second winners' medal. He finished off the year by claiming an Oireachtas medal following a 4-4 to 1-8 defeat of Clare.

Skehan made his senior championship debut on 23 June 1968 in a 3-13 to 4-6 Leinster semi-final defeat of Offaly. A six-month suspension for regular 'keeper Ollie Walsh resulted in Skehan being retained, however, Wexford put an end to Kilkenny's hopes of securing the title in 1968.

The Noresiders bounced back the following year with Skehan, who was back on the substitutes' bench once again, collecting a fifth Leinster medal following a 3–9 to 0–16 defeat of Offaly. On 7 September 1969 Kilkenny took on Cork in the All-Ireland decider, however, Skehan remained off the starting fifteen. Kilkenny ran out winners on a 2–15 to 2–9 scoreline with Skehan collecting a third All-Ireland medal as a non-playing substitute.

After surrendering their provincial and All-Ireland crowns to Wexford the following year, Skehan was still a non-playing substitute as Kilkenny defeated Wexford by 6-16 to 3-16 to take the Leinster title once again. It was his sixth winners' medal. On 5 September 1971 Kilkenny faced Tipperary in the All-Ireland final, the Cats faced a 5–17 to 5–14 defeat.

First-choice goalkeeper

Not only did Skehan take over as first-choice goalkeeper with the Kilkenny senior team in 1972 but he was also appointed captain. He won his first Leinster medal on the field of play, his seventh over all, following a 3-16 to 1-14 defeat of Wexford in a replay of the provincial decider. Cork provided the opposition in the All-Ireland final on 3 September 1972, a game which is often considered to be one of the classic games of the modern era. Halfway through the second-half Cork were on form and stretched their lead to eight points. Kilkenny's great scoring threat, Eddie Keher, was deployed closer to goal and finished the game with 2–9. A fifteen-point swing resulted in Kilkenny winning the game by 3–24 to 5–11. Not only did Skehan collect his first All-Ireland medal on the field of play but he also had the honour of lifting the Liam MacCarthy Cup. He finished the year by claiming his first All-Star.

Skehan won his second Leinster medal on the field of play in 1973 following a 4–22 to 3–15 defeat of Wexford. On 2 September 1973 Kilkenny faced Limerick in the All-Ireland decider. The game hung in the balance for the first-half, however, eight minutes after the restart Mossie Dowling got a vital goal for Limerick. Shortly after this Richie Bennis spearheaded a rampant Limerick attack which resulted in a 1–21 to 1–14 victory for Limerick. In spite if this defeat Skehan finished off the year by winning his second All-Star.

Wexford were, once again, narrowly defeated by Kilkenny in the 1974 provincial decider. The remarkable 6–13 to 2–24 victory gave Skehen a third successive Leinster medal on the field of play. In a repeat of the previous year Limerick provided the opposition in the subsequent All-Ireland final on 1 September 1974. The Munster champions stormed to a five-point lead in the first eleven minutes, however, a converted penalty by Eddie Keher, supplemented by further goals from Mick Brennan and Pat Delaney gave Kilkenny a 3–19 to 1–13 victory. It was a second All-Ireland medal on the field of play for Skehan and his fifth winners' medal in all. He later won a third All-Star.

Kilkenny made it five successive provincial titles in-a-row in 1975. The 2–20 to 2–14 defeat of Wexford gave Skehen his fourth successive Leinster medal on the field of play and his tenth winners' medal overall. On 7 September 1975, Skehan lined out in his fourth successive All-Ireland final, with surprise semi-final winners Galway providing the opposition. Playing with the wind in the first half, Galway found themselves ahead by 0–9 to 1–3 at the interval. Eddie Keher's huge tally of 2–7 kept Galway at bay giving Kilkenny a 2–22 to 2–10 victory. As well as collecting a third All-Ireland medal in four seasons Skehan later added a fourth successive All-Star to his collection.

Decline and then resurgence

In 1976 Skehan won a first National Hurling League medal following a 6–14 to 1–14 trouncing of Clare in a replay. Kilkenny's championship ambitions unravelled in spectacular fashion in the subsequent provincial campaign, when a 2–20 to 1–6 trouncing by Wexford dumped Skehan's team out of the championship. In spite of this Skehan was later presented with a fifth All-Star.

After two years of defeats Kilkenny's fortunes took an upward turn in 1978. A 2–16 to 1–16 defeat of three-in-a-row hopefuls Wexford gave Skehan a fifth Leinster medal on the field. On 3 September 1978 Kilkenny faced reigning champions Cork in the All-Ireland decider. Cork secured a first three-in-a-row of All-Ireland titles for the first time in over twenty years, as a Jimmy Barry-Murphy goal deceived Skehan and helped the team to a 1–15 to 2–8 victory.

Skehan won a sixth Leinster medal in his own right in 1979 as Wexford were defeated by 2-21 to 2-17. On 2 September 1979 Kilkenny faced Galway in the All-Ireland final. Bad weather and an unofficial train drivers’ strike resulted in the lowest attendance at a final in over twenty years. The bad weather also affected the hurling with Kilkenny scoring two freak goals as Galway ‘keeper Séamus Shinnors had a nightmare of a game. A Liam “Chunky” O’Brien 70-yard free went all the way to the net in the first half, while with just three minutes remaining a 45-yard shot from Mick Brennan was helped by the wind and dipped under the crossbar. Kilkenny won by 2-12 to 1-8 with Skehan winning his fourth All-Ireland medal on the field of play.

Twilight successes

After a fallow two-year period, Kilkenny bounced back in 1982 with Skehan winning a second league medal following a 2-14 to 1-11 defeat of Wexford. He later added a seventh Leinster medal to his collection following a 1-11 to 0-12 defeat of three-in-a-row hopefuls and reigning All-Ireland champions Offaly. On 5 September 1982 Kilkenny and Cork renewed their rivalry in the All-Ireland decider. The Cats were rank outsiders on the day, however, a brilliant save by Skehan was followed by two quick goals by Christy Heffernan just before the interval. Éamonn O'Donoghue pegged a goal back for Cork, however, Ger Fennelly added a third for Kilkenny who secured a 3-18 to 1-13 victory. It was a fifth All-Ireland medal for Skehan and a then record-equaling eighth winners' medal in all. A sixth All-Star quickly followed while he was also named Texaco Hurler of the Year.

Skehan won a third league medal in 1983 following a narrow 2-14 to 2-12 defeat of Limerick before later collecting an eighth Leinster medal, his fourteenth over all, as Offaly were accounted for by 1-17 to 0-13. The All-Ireland final on 4 September 1983 was a replay of the previous year with Cork hoping to avenge that defeat. Billy Fitzpatrick was the star with ten points, giving Kilkenny a 2-14 to 1-9 lead with seventeen minutes left, however, they failed to score for the remainder of the game. A stunning comeback by Cork just fell short and Skehan collected a sixth All-Ireland medal following a 2-14 to 2-12 victory. It was a record-breaking ninth winners' medal, including his three won as a non-playing substitute, while he finished off the year by winning a seventh All-Star.

After failing in their bid for a third successive All-Ireland in 1984, Skehan decided to retire from inter-county hurling following the conclusion of the 1984-85 league.

Inter-provincial

Skehan also lined out with Leinster in the inter-provincial hurling competition and enjoyed much success.  He captured his first Railway Cup title in 1973 when Leinster defeated arch-rivals Munster.  Skehan made it three in-a-row with further victories over Munster in 1974 and 1975.  Four years later in 1979 he captured his fourth and final Railway Cup medal as Connacht fell in the final.

Coaching career

Kilkenny junior manager

In 1991 Skehan joined the management team of the Kilkenny junior hurlers as coach-trainer in succession to Ollie Walsh. His firsts season in charge saw Kilkenny claim the Leinster crown following a 3-12 to 2-6 defeat of Wexford.

Two years later in 1993 Skehan's junior charges secured the Leinster title once again following a 1-15 to 0-9 defeat of Wexford. On 18 July 1993 Kilkenny faced Clare in the All-Ireland decider. A 3-10 to 0-8 trouncing was the result on that occasion.

Kilkenny retained their Leinster title in 1994 following a 2-18 to 3-8 defeat of Wexford. On 16 July 1994 Kilkenny faced Cork in the All-Ireland decider. A narrow 2-13 to 2-11 defeat was the result for Skehan's side.

Skehan's side secured a third successive Leinster medal in 1995 as a 2-14 to 4-5 score line secured the victory. On 12 August 1995 Kilkenny faced Clare in the All-Ireland decider. A 1-20 to 1-6 trouncing secured the All-Ireland title.

The four-in-a-row of provincial titles was secured in 1996 following a 1-13 to 1-6 defeat of Wexford once again. On 15 September 1996 Kilkenny had the chance of retaining their All-Ireland crown when they faced Galway in the decider. A 1-14 to 2-9 defeat was the result for Skehan's side.

Vocational schools

In 1997 Skehan helped train the Kilkenny vocational schools team. After securing the Leinster title following a defeat of Offaly, Skehan's side faced a subsequent All-Ireland semi-final defeat by Cork.

Kilkenny senior selector

Skehan has also served as a selector with the Kilkenny senior hurlers under Brian Cody.  During his tenure as a selector in the early 2000s (decade) Kilkenny captured back-to-back All-Ireland titles in 2002 and 2003.  Those two years also saw Skehan guide the Leinster provincial team to back-to-back Railway Cup titles.

Post-playing career

In retirement from playing Skehan, as well as maintaining a keen interest in the game, has also come to be regarded as one of the greatest goalkeepers of all-time.  In 1997 he took charge of the Kilkenny intermediate hurling team for the newly revived All-Ireland series of games.  He guided his county to the championship decider in 1998, however, Kilkenny were defeated by Limerick on that occasion.  Following Kevin Fennelly's departure as manager of the Kilkenny senior team at the end of 1998, Skehan was one of the names mentioned as a possible successor. The job eventually went to his former team-mate Brian Cody.

Skehan was one of Kilkenny's best prospects for the goalkeeping position on the Team of the Millennium, however, he faced still opposition from such legends as his fellow county man Ollie Walsh, Cork's Ger Cunningham and Wexford's Art Foley.  In the end the honour went to Tipperary's three in-a-row winning 'keeper Tony Reddin.  He was also beaten into second place for the 'keeper position on the Kilkenny Hurling Team of the Century.  In spite of this Skehan is unique among exponents of Gaelic games. Only Henry Shefflin, with 10 All-Ireland medals won on the field of play between 1999 and 2014, has surpassed the astonishing record of nine All-Ireland medals won by Skehan from 1963 to 1983.  With three of those medals won as a substitute, his record is surpassed by the eight All-Ireland's won by both Christy Ring and John Doyle, which were all won on the field of play.

On 7 February 2008 Skehan was profiled on the TG4 television programme Laochra Gael.

Honours

Player

Bennettsbridge
Kilkenny Senior Hurling Championship (4): 1964, 1966, 1967, 1971

Kilkenny
All-Ireland Senior Hurling Championship (9): 1963 (sub), 1967 (sub), 1969 (sub), 1972, 1974, 1975, 1979, 1982, 1983
Leinster Senior Hurling Championship (14): 1963 (sub), 1964 (sub), 1966 (sub), 1967 (sub), 1969 (sub), 1971 (sub), 1972, 1973, 1974, 1975, 1978, 1979, 1982, 1983
National Hurling League (3): 1975-76, 1981-82, 1982-83
Oireachtas Tournament (1): 1967
All-Ireland Minor Hurling Championship (1): 1962
Leinster Minor Hurling Championship (1): 1962

Leinster
Railway Cup (4): 1973, 1974, 1975, 1979

Coach

Kilkenny
All-Ireland Junior Hurling Championship (1): 1995
Leinster Junior Hurling Championship (5): 1991, 1993, 1994, 1995, 1996

Individual

Honours
The 125 greatest stars of the GAA: No. 16
Supreme All-Stars Team: Goalkeeper
Texaco Hurler of the Year (1): 1982
All-Star (7): 1972, 1973, 1974, 1975, 1976, 1982, 1983
GAA Hall of Fame Inductee: 2013
In May 2020, the Irish Independent named Skehan at number fifteen in its "Top 20 hurlers in Ireland over the past 50 years". He was the only goalkeeper included.

References

 

 

1945 births
Living people
All-Ireland Senior Hurling Championship winners
All Stars Awards winners (hurling)
Bennettsbridge hurlers
Hurling goalkeepers
Hurling managers
Hurling selectors
Kilkenny inter-county hurlers
Leinster inter-provincial hurlers